Pedro Armendáriz García (born 19 August 1967) is a Mexican politician affiliated with the National Action Party. As of 2014 he served as Deputy of the LX Legislature of the Mexican Congress representing Aguascalientes.

References

1967 births
Living people
Politicians from Aguascalientes
Members of the Chamber of Deputies (Mexico)
National Action Party (Mexico) politicians
21st-century Mexican politicians
Autonomous University of Aguascalientes alumni
Municipal presidents in Aguascalientes